Ostrvica or Pashallorë  is a mountain located in the Prizren Municipality of Kosovo.

External links
Location

See also
Hiking in Kosovo
Ošljak

Notes

Mountains of Kosovo
Two-thousanders of Kosovo